Loch Stack is a large, irregularly shaped freshwater loch in the Northwest of Scotland. Ben Stack rises steeply from the loch's southwestern shore and Arkle lies directly to the north.

Survey
The loch was surveyed between 6 and 8 September 1902 by T.N. Johnston and James Murray and later charted as part of the Sir John Murray's Bathymetrical Survey of Fresh-Water Lochs of Scotland 1897-1909.

References

Stack
Stack